Elections to Dudley Metropolitan Borough Council were held on 1 May 2008. One third of the council was up for election, with an additional seat in Sedgley ward following the resignation of a councillor.

Following the election the Conservative Party held 43 seats, the Labour Party held 26 seats, the Liberal Democrats held 2 seats, and the UK Independence Party held one seat.

Candidates

Amblecote ward

Belle Vale ward

Brierley Hill ward

Brockmoor & Pensnett ward

Castle & Priory ward

Coseley East ward

Cradley & Foxcote ward

Gornal ward

Halesowen North ward

Halesowen South ward

Hayley Green & Cradley South ward

Kingswinford North & Wall Heath ward

Kingswinford South ward

Lye & Wollescote ward

Netherton, Woodside & St. Andrew's ward

Norton ward

Pedmore & Stourbridge East ward

Quarry Bank & Dudley Wood ward

Sedgley ward

St. James's ward

St. Thomas's ward

Upper Gornal & Woodsetton ward

Wollaston & Stourbridge Town ward

Wordsley ward

External links
Dudley Metropolitan Borough Council election results

2008 English local elections
2008
2000s in the West Midlands (county)